The 1951 Tampa Spartans football team represented the University of Tampa in the 1951 college football season. It was the Spartans' 15th season. The team was led by head coach Frank Sinkwich, in his second year, and played their home games at Phillips Field in Tampa, Florida. They finished with a record of seven wins, three losses and one tie (7–3–1).

A week after they opened the season with a 72–0 victory over Patrick Air Force Base at home, the Spartans lost their first road game of the season at Bradley 32–6. The next Friday, Tampa lost their second consecutive game on the road. This time,  overcame a 14–7 halftime deficit with a pair of third-quarter touchdowns in their 21–14 victory in Spartanburg. The Spartans then returned home and won games over Jacksonville State and  before they played Stetson to a 14–14 tie at DeLand after Tampa blocked a last-second field goal attempt by the Hatters. Against the Seminoles, Tampa won in a 14–6 upset at Phillips Field before 12,500 fans.

In mid-November, Tampa accepted an invitation to compete in their first postseason game against  in the first Brandeis Classic at Miami Beach. Against the Judges, the Spartans won 7–0 after they scored their only points on an 18-yard John Lahosky touchdown pass to H. L. Hiers on their opening drive. In February 1952, Sinkwich resigned as head coach of the Spartans after only two seasons and entered private business.

Schedule

References

Tampa
Tampa Spartans football seasons
Tampa Spartans football